Methyl isobutyl ketone (MIBK) is the common name for the organic compound 4-methylpentan-2-one, condensed chemical formula (CH3)2CHCH2C(O)CH3. This colourless liquid, a ketone, is used as a solvent for gums, resins, paints, varnishes, lacquers, and nitrocellulose.

Production
At laboratory scale, MIBK can be produced via a three-step process using acetone as the starting material. Self-condensation, a type of aldol reaction, produces diacetone alcohol, which readily dehydrates to give 4-methylpent-3-en-2-one (commonly, mesityl oxide). Mesityl oxide is then hydrogenated to give MIBK.

Industrially, these three steps are combined. Acetone is treated with a strongly acidic, palladium catalyst-doped cation exchange resin under medium pressure of hydrogen. Several million kilograms are produced annually.

Uses 

MIBK is used as a solvent for nitrocellulose, lacquers, and certain polymers and resins.

Precursor to 6PPD
Another major use is as a precursor to N-(1,3-dimethylbutyl)-N'''-phenyl-p''-phenylene diamine (6PPD), an antiozonant used in tires. 6PPD is prepared by reductive coupling of MIBK with 4-aminodiphenylamine.

Solvent and niche applications
Unlike the other common ketone solvents, acetone and MEK, MIBK has quite low solubility in water, making it useful for liquid-liquid extraction. It has a similar polarity to ethyl acetate, but greater stability towards aqueous acid and base. It can be used to extract gold, silver and other precious metals from cyanide solutions, such as those found at gold mines, to determine the levels of those dissolved metals. Diisobutyl ketone (DIBK), a related lipophilic ketone, is also used for this purpose.  Methyl isobutyl ketone is also used as a denaturing agent for denatured alcohol. When mixed with water or isopropyl alcohol MIBK serves as a developer for PMMA electron beam lithography resist.  MIBK is used as a solvent for CS in the preparation of the CS spray used currently by American and British police forces.

References

External links 
 International Chemical Safety Card 0511
 National Pollutant Inventory - Methyl isobutyl ketone fact sheet
 NIOSH Pocket Guide to Chemical Hazards

Hazardous air pollutants
Hexanones
Ketone solvents
Commodity chemicals
IARC Group 2B carcinogens